Bhimkanta Buragohain (aliases Mama, Sir), also called the Father of ULFA, was the political advisor and ideologue of the revolutionary organisation ULFA in Assam. He was also one of the founder leaders of the organisation.

Arrest
He was arrested by the Bhutanese Royal Army during Operation All Clear in December 2003 and was handed over to the Indian Army in January 2004. He was released from jail after seven years on 5 December 2010.

Rumours of death
The ULFA claimed that Buragohain had been captured and killed during Operation All Clear by the Royal Bhutan Army (RBA) while he was leading a group of women and children who were attempting to surrender and waving a white flag. Arabinda Rajkhowa, the chairman of the outfit, also appealed to the Bhutan King to return the dead body to his family. It also called a 48-hour Assam Bandh on 20–21 December 2003. The RBA claimed that Buragohain was neither captured nor killed, whereas the Indian Army asserted that he had been killed. The Guwahati High Court on 23 December 2003, directed the Army authority to hand over the body, if in possession, to the nearest police station so that his family could perform the last rites.

On 26 December 2003, Lt. Gen. Mohinder Singh, General Officer Commanding 4 Corps, in Tezpur, disproving the rumours and claims made by ULFA and other organizations, produced Buragohain to the media. On 27 December 2003,. He was accompanied by self-styled Major Robin Handique, SS Major Amarjit Gogoi and Bolin Das. Buragohain was imprisoned in Tezpur Jail. and then in Guwahati Central jail.

Charges
Cases registered against Buragohain in various Police Stations of Assam are:

Death
He died of cardiac arrest at his own residence at Dhala Ahomgaon, Tinsukia district, Assam on 19 December 2011.

See also
List of top leaders of ULFA
Sanjukta Mukti Fouj
People's Consultative Group
Operation All Clear

References

People from Tinsukia district
Prisoners and detainees from Assam
Prisoners and detainees of Bhutan
1931 births
ULFA members
2011 deaths